The Jacobite Army, sometimes referred to as the Highland Army, was the military force assembled by Charles Edward Stuart and his Jacobite supporters during the 1745 Rising that attempted to restore the House of Stuart to the British throne.

Starting with less than 1,000 men at Glenfinnan in August 1745, the Jacobite army won a significant victory at Prestonpans in September. A force of about 5,500 then invaded England in November and reached as far south as Derby before successfully retreating into Scotland. Reaching a peak strength of between 9,000 and 14,000, they won another victory in January 1746 at Falkirk, before defeat at Culloden in April. While a large number of Jacobites remained in arms, lack of external and domestic support combined with overwhelming government numbers meant they dispersed, ending the rebellion.

Once characterised as a largely Gaelic-speaking force recruited from the Scottish Highlands using traditional weapons and tactics, modern historians have demonstrated this was only partially accurate. The army also included a large number of north-eastern and lowland Scots, along with substantial Franco-Irish and English contingents, who were drilled and organised in line with contemporary European military practices.

Formation and leadership

Charles left France on 15 July aboard Du Teillay, supplies and 70 volunteers from the Irish Brigade transported by Elizabeth, an elderly 64-gun warship. Four days out, they were intercepted by HMS Lion which engaged Elizabeth; after a four hour battle, both were forced to return to port, while  Du Teillay continued to Eriskay. This meant Charles arrived with few weapons, accompanied only by the "Seven Men of Moidart," among them the elderly Marquess of Tullibardine and John O'Sullivan, an Irish-born officer in the French army.

Many of those contacted on arrival told Charles to return to France but Lochiel's commitment persuaded enough for the Rebellion to be launched at Glenfinnan on 19 August. O'Sullivan estimated initial numbers as around 1,000, with 700 Camerons plus several hundred men from Lochaber led by Keppoch. 

Though physically fit, they lacked discipline and were poorly armed, accentuating the loss of Elizabeth with its weapons and the regulars intended to provide the core of the Jacobite army. Although Charles was in nominal command, his inexperience meant O'Sullivan acted as adjutant-general and quartermaster-general, handling personnel, training and logistics.

O'Sullivan created an army organised along conventional European lines and his use of the then-novel divisional structure is viewed as a major factor in the Jacobites' speed of movement. Further recruits came in as they marched on Edinburgh; by the time of Prestonpans on 21 September, numbers had increased to around 2,500.

One of these recruits was Tullibardine's younger brother, Lord George Murray, who took part in the failed Risings of 1715 and 1719. Despite this, his acceptance of a pardon in 1725 and swearing an Oath of Allegiance to George II in 1739 made some suspicious, including Charles' chief Scottish advisor, Murray of Broughton. Although primarily driven by Broughton's political ambitions, others recorded Murray's genuine military talents were undermined by a quick temper, arrogance and inability to take advice. 

Co-operation with O'Sullivan was essential but failed to develop, Murray arguing Highland customs better suited the bulk of their recruits and it was unrealistic to expect them to execute weapons drill or carry out written orders. Others considered these views outdated, including Sir John MacDonald, an Irish exile who acted as Inspector-General of Cavalry. There was some truth in both positions; plenty of Scots served in European armies but the military aspects of clan society had been in decline for decades and most Highland levies were illiterate agricultural workers.

Even for regular troops, training was a concern as infantry drill became increasingly complex; before and after 1746, peacetime inspections consistently noted an alarmingly high number of British regiments as 'Not fit for service.' This had many causes, one of the most significant being lack of live firing practice and the Jacobites were short of both weapons and ammunition. The exiles also failed to appreciate the Highland obligation to provide military service assumed short periods of warfare, not continuous service for six months or a year. After Prestonpans and Falkirk, the clan chiefs could not prevent large numbers of their levies returning home; when Charles wanted to attack Cumberland in early February 1746, he was told the army was in no state to fight a battle.

Charles considered his 'Lieutenant-Generals' subordinates, whose duty was to comply with his orders; Murray disagreed and matters were not helped by a furious row between the two prior to Prestonpans. Lord Elcho later wrote the Scots were concerned from the beginning by Charles' autocratic style and fears he was overly influenced by his Irish advisors. 

At their insistence, Charles established a "Council of War" to agree military strategy but deeply resented what he viewed as an imposition by subjects on their divinely appointed monarch. Consisting of 15-20 senior leaders, it was dominated by the Highlanders who provided most of the manpower and decisions reflected their priorities. The civilian equivalent or 'Privy Council' had a higher proportion of Lowland gentry, thus dividing leadership between competing power centres.

Viscount Strathallan was appointed commander in Scotland and continued recruiting, while the field army of roughly 5,500 invaded England in early November. Command was split between the three lieutenant-generals: Murray, Tullibardine, and James Drummond, titular Duke of Perth. In theory, the three rotated command on a daily basis, but Tullibardine's poor health and Perth's inexperience meant in practice it was exercised by Murray.

Charles' relationship with the Scots began to deteriorate during pre-invasion discussions in Edinburgh and worsened when Murray resigned at Carlisle prior to being reinstated. After Derby, the War Council met only once more, an acrimonious session at Crieff in February 1746. Disappointment and heavy drinking resulted in repeated accusations by Charles that the Scots were traitors, reinforced when Murray advised abandoning plans to invade England. Instead, he proposed an insurgency in the Highlands that would "...oblige the Crown to come to terms, because the war rendered it necessary...English troops be occupied elsewhere".

In late November, Perth's brother John Drummond landed in Scotland and replaced Strathallan but his arrival introduced another element of division into the Jacobite leadership. He and Charles previously clashed in France and his first act was to countermand instructions new recruits be sent into England; as an officer in the French army, he had orders not to leave Scotland until all fortresses held by British government troops had been taken. Since he brought money, weapons, siege artillery and 150 Scots and Irish regulars, he could not be ignored; at Falkirk and Culloden, O'Sullivan exercised effective command, with Murray, Perth and Drummond as brigade commanders but the different factions viewed each other with suspicion and hostility.

Recruitment

Areas of recruitment

In contrast to 1715, many joined the Jacobites in 1745 for reasons other than Stuart loyalism. While 46% of the Jacobite army came from the Highlands and Islands, there is no evidence this was any more common in the Highlands post-1715 than elsewhere in Scotland.

A key factor in recruiting was the feudal nature of clan society, which obliged tenants to provide their landlord with military service; the majority of Highland recruits came from a small number of western clans whose leaders joined the rebellion, like Lochiel and Keppoch. This obligation was based on traditional clan warfare, which was short-term and emphasised raiding, rather than set piece battles; even experienced Highland generals like Montrose in 1645 or Dundee in 1689 struggled to keep their armies together and it continued to be a problem in 1745.

With the exception of the strongly Presbyterian south-west, the Jacobites also recruited outside the Highlands, although inevitably some were coerced. Jacobite leaders Lord George Murray, the Duke of Perth and Tullibardine had close links to Perthshire, which supplied around 20% of total recruits. Another 24% came from the north-east, where John Gordon of Glenbucket was one of the first to join the Rising; support was focused around Auchmedden, Pitsligo and Fyvie, areas Royalist and Episcopalian since the 1639 Bishops War.

The northeastern ports in particular provided significant numbers; by some estimates, up to a quarter of the adult male population of Montrose saw Jacobite service. Long after the Rising was over, the region continued to feature in Government reports as a centre of Jacobite 'disaffection', with the shipmasters of Montrose, Stonehive, Peterhead and other ports involved in a two-way traffic of exiles and recruits for French service.

However, recruiting figures did not necessarily reflect majority opinion; even among 'Jacobite' clans like the MacDonalds, major figures like MacDonald of Sleat refused to join. The commercial centres of Edinburgh and Glasgow remained solidly pro-government, while in early November there were anti-Jacobite riots in Perth. This extended outside Scotland; after Prestonpans, Walter Shairp, a merchant from Edinburgh working in Liverpool, joined a local pro-government volunteer force known as the 'Liverpool Blues,' which participated in the second siege of Carlisle.

Recruiting methods and motivation

Jacobite recruiting methods in Scotland varied across the country. Adherence was fundamentally decided by personal or local factors, and often differed between officers and the rank and file.

Volunteers

While many volunteered simply for adventure, Stuart loyalism played a part, as did attempts by Charles to follow his predecessors in appealing to disenfranchised groups in general, whether religious or political.

The single most common issue for Scots volunteers was opposition to the 1707 Union between Scotland and England; after 1708, the exiled Stuarts explicitly appealed to this segment of society. They included James Hepburn of Keith, a fierce critic of both Catholicism and James II who viewed Union as 'humiliating to his country....'

Despite concerns over the impact on English sympathisers, Charles published two "Declarations" on 9 and 10 October, the first dissolving the "pretended Union," the second rejecting the 1701 Act of Settlement. A proposal to repeal the Malt Tax was particularly well received, one contemporary noting the rebels were "looked upon [...] as the deliverers of their country". However, taxes have always been unpopular and while it caused riots when first imposed in 1725, these quickly tailed off; the most serious demonstrations occurred in Glasgow, a town Charles noted as one 'where I have no friends and who are not at pains to hide it.'

Stuart support for religious toleration arose from their own Catholicism but its impact was limited. Modern use of the labels Episcopalian or Presbyterian imply differences in doctrine; in 1745, they primarily related to differences over governance of the Church of Scotland or kirk, and the Nonjuring schism over swearing allegiance to the Hanoverians. The vast majority of Scots, whether Episcopalian or Presbyterian, were doctrinal Calvinists, which facilitated the post-1707 readmission of many Episcopalians to the kirk. By 1745, Non-juring congregations were concentrated along the north-east coast, and many recruits came from this element of society.

Conversely, these factors help explain the lack of English support. Many Tories abandoned the Stuarts in 1688 when James' policies seemed to threaten the primacy of the Church of England; ensuring that remained a concern, whether it be from Catholics like Charles and his exile advisors or the Scots Calvinists that formed the bulk of his army. The only English town to provide any number of recruits was Manchester, also one of the very few to retain a significant Non-Juring congregation; its officers included three sons of its bishop Thomas Deacon.

While Francis Towneley, colonel of the Manchester Regiment, and other Jacobite officers were Catholic, contrary to government propaganda participants at all levels were overwhelmingly Protestant. There was even a Quaker at Culloden, Jonathan Forbes, laird of Brux in Aberdeenshire, one of the only places in Scotland to establish a meaningful Non-Conformist presence during the period of religious toleration under the Protectorate in the 1650s. Since a Stuart restoration was unlikely to improve the position of the Catholic Church, the link with Jacobitism was more likely a function of familial or other connections.

In this period, regiments were formed by appointing captains, who then recruited their own companies, for which they would be paid. The structured nature of society meant this required men with social and financial standing, who could first attract recruits, then equip and pay them in advance; it was here the lack of support from the English gentry was most felt. Many Scots Episcopalians were from the higher social classes, while the military obligations of clan service made this much easier in the Highlands; in the Atholl Brigade, most volunteers were officers, connected by religion and familial links to the House of Atholl but the rank and file were essentially a conscript force.

Clan levies, vassalage and impressment

Many units were raised under the feudal obligation of vassalage, whereby tenants held land in return for military service. While this led authors like John Prebble to depict the Jacobites as a quasi-feudal army, the reality is more complex.

Clan chiefs in the north-west employed a traditional form of tenure requiring tacksmen to supply a number of armed sub-tenants on demand; this proved relatively successful, primarily because tenants strongly identified with the interests of their chief. A similar system was used in Perthshire and the north-east but here, tenants of landowners like Glenbucket held their leases in return for military service, irrespective of clan loyalties. 
Rents were held at a low level due to this expectation and few tenants had written leases, increasing the pressure on them to comply.

The extent of coercion or "forcing out" has long been an area of dispute, since it was a common defence used by rebels taken prisoner. The authorities rigorously investigated such claims and the consensus among historians is impressment was a significant factor, both in recruiting and retaining men. The short-term patterns of clan warfare meant this was especially true among Highlanders; after Prestonpans and Falkirk, many went home to secure their plunder, a factor that delayed the invasion of England and led to the retreat from Stirling.

Lochiel and Keppoch were among those alleged to have used threats of violence or eviction to conscript their tenants. Lochiel's main agent in this process was his younger brother Archibald Cameron; on his return from exile in 1753, he was allegedly betrayed by Cameron clansmen in revenge and later executed.

North-eastern landowners also had difficulty in recruiting tenants, even in districts that provided large numbers in 1715. Alexander MacDonald, then with the Jacobite army in Musselburgh, wrote to his father in October 1745 that Lord Lewis Gordon was "putting into prison all who are not willing to rise." One member of the Atholl Brigade claimed Mrs Robertson, daughter of his feudal superior Lady Nairne, "threatened to burn his house and effects" if he did not join; another claimed he was given the choice of enlisting or paying £50 Scots for a substitute. Some recruits were "ignorant even of the name of the unit they had joined".

Decisions were sometimes made contrary to the wishes, or even threats, of their chief; the men of Glen Urquhart committed to the Rising only after a "lengthy and mature debate" held on a Sunday in Kilmore churchyard. Despite the supposed strength of feudal bonds, many of Keppoch's men deserted early on after a "private quarrel" with him. Key predictors in recruiting seemed to have been a mixture of personal prestige or unequivocal action, with poor harvests in the Western Highlands in 1744 and 1745 also influencing enlistment among Highland farmers.

Deserters and conscripts

The Jacobite Army tried to recruit from among prisoners taken in battle, and such so-called 'deserters' came to form a significant source of manpower. A large group were drafted into the Irish Picquets from Guise's 6th Regiment of Foot after the surrender of their garrisons at Inverness and Fort Augustus; 98 were retaken at Culloden of whom many would have faced summary execution. Others, more accurately described as 'deserters', had previously absconded from the army in Flanders before returning to Scotland with the Irish Picquets or Royal Ecossais.

Many of the Jacobite regiments were themselves affected quite heavily by desertion and during the later phases of the rebellion the Jacobite administration implemented an equivalent of the old Scottish 'fencible' system, demanding that landowners provide one properly equipped man for every £100 of rent. The quotas were filled in various ways and one third of the Jacobites from Banffshire were reported to have been 'hired out by the County': as with the British army, paid substitution was also common, in which an individual hired another person to serve in their place. Such hired men were usually treated leniently after the Rising; many were released or simply left undisturbed at home.

The Jacobite recruiters could not afford to be selective and recruited many who would not have met later conscription standards. While some historical descriptions gave an impression of the Highland rank and file as being tall, healthy men in the prime of life, prisoner returns from after the Rising do not bear this out. The average height of Jacobite prisoners awaiting transportation in October 1746 was 5 feet 4.125 inches: 13.6% were 50 years old and upwards, while a further 8% were 16 and 17 year olds; contemporary observers commented on the "great number of boys and old men" in the Jacobite army. A number were also recorded as having physical and other disabilities: one man of Keppoch's regiment was stated to be a deaf-mute; John MacLennan of Glengarry's had club feet; Hugh Johnston and Matthew Matthews of the Manchester Regiment were blind in one eye and deaf respectively; William Hargrave was described as having a "distemper'd brain" and Alexander Haldane as "wrong in his judgment".

Regular soldiers in French service

When Charles sailed from France in July 1745, he was accompanied by Elizabeth, an elderly 64-gun warship carrying most of the weapons and volunteers from the French Army's Irish Brigade. They were intercepted by HMS Lion and after a four hour battle with Elizabeth, both were forced to return to port, depriving Charles of the regular soldiers originally intended as the core of the Jacobite army.

Jacobite agents on the continent continued attempts to secure foreign backing; Daniel O'Brien, commander of the Franco-Irish Picquets, negotiated with Carl Fredrik Scheffer, Swedish ambassador in France, seeking to enlist 1,000 troops to be shipped from France to Scotland. While French caution ultimately led to the failure of the Swedish initiative, in October 1745 French foreign minister d'Argenson agreed to provide assistance to the Jacobites.

Regular troops in the Jacobite army came from three main sources, the first being the Royal Scots or Royal Ecossais. Originally recruited in August 1744 by John Drummond, it was landed in Montrose in November 1745 but despite attempts to raise a second battalion in Scotland, never totalled more than 400. The second was the Irish Brigade; each of the six regiments supplied 50 men but only half evaded the Royal Navy blockade. The third was the Fitzjames cavalry regiment; only one of the four squadrons despatched reached Scotland, and without their horses.

Including a small number of specialists, such as Mirabel de Gordon, the allegedly incompetent artillery officer who supervised the Siege of Stirling Castle, this implies a maximum of 600 to 700 regular troops. The numbers were well documented because regulars were treated as prisoners of war, rather than rebels and so the British government tracked them very carefully. The Irish detachment suffered 25% losses at Culloden and their sacrifice was crucial in enabling Charles to escape but there were never enough of them.

Composition and organisation

Infantry

The Jacobite infantry was initially divided into two divisions, 'Highland' and 'Low Country Foot', nominally commanded by Murray and Perth, who was replaced by Charles after Carlisle. Following British army custom, they were split into regiments, usually of one battalion, although some had two after the French model. Each battalion had a nominal strength of 200 to 300 men, although actual numbers were often much smaller, subdivided into companies. The regiments of Lochiel, Glengarry and Ogilvy also had grenadier companies, although how these were distinguished is not recorded.

Highland regiments were traditionally organised by clan, officered by their own tacksmen; this made some impractically small and efforts were made to amalgamate them to produce more evenly sized units. Commissions were often used to reward those who brought in recruits, while O'Sullivan noted the Highlanders "would not mix or separate, & wou'd have double officers, [that] is two Captns & two Lts, to each Compagny, strong or weak". These factors meant the Jacobite army was over-officered, as recorded by the Master of Sinclair.

While successful with Lowland recruits, Highland military tradition was unsuited to the European-style army O'Sullivan wanted to create. Even professional soldiers required constant training in firing and reloading; the Jacobites lacked time, weapons and ammunition, although Murray reportedly used a simplified but effective form of drill for them. Some of the Lowland regiments, notably Ogilvy's, may have been taught musket drill based on the 1727 British army regulations. Most Jacobite professionals had been trained in France, and infantry drill and tactics showed a French influence: movement in narrow column formation, deployment of reserves in column, and firing in volleys followed by fire a billebaude (at will) as opposed to the rigid 'firings' by platoon used by the British army. The French emphasis on shock tactics, rather than massed firepower, suited the abilities and training levels of the Jacobite troops.

Cavalry

Jacobite cavalry was small in number in 1745-6 and were restricted largely to scouting and other typical light cavalry duties. Despite this, the units that were raised arguably performed better in this role during the campaign than the regulars opposing them. All except one of the 'regiments' comprised two troops and were over-officered to an even greater degree than the infantry, as commissions were used to reward Jacobite support.

Artillery

As with the cavalry, the Jacobite artillery was small and under-resourced, but was better organised than traditionally depicted. For most of the campaign it was led by a French regular, Captain James Grant of the Regiment Lally. Grant arrived in October 1745 along with 12 French gunners, who were intended to train new recruits. At Edinburgh, he organised two companies of Perth's regiment as gunners, and later drafted a group from the Manchester Regiment as a pioneer company.

The army was always short of heavy weapons, but during the invasion of England an artillery train was formed using six elderly guns captured from Cope at Prestonpans, six modern four-pounders captured at Fontenoy and shipped to Scotland by the French, and an obsolete 16th century brass cannon from Blair Atholl. Several of these guns and one company were left at Carlisle under Captain John Burnet of Campfield, a former British artillery regular.

Several larger siege guns were landed at Montrose in November, along with a number of three-pounders taken at Fontenoy. At Stirling, Grant was absent due to a wound received at Fort William: the siege artillery was placed under the command of a Franco-Scottish engineer Loüis-Antoine-Alexandre-François de Gordon, usually known by the possible nom-de-guerre of the 'Marquis de Mirabelle'. The abilities of "Mr. Admirable", as he was derisively called by the Scots, were not well-regarded and the artillery's placement and performance at Stirling were so poor it was suspected he had been bribed. Most of the siege artillery was abandoned when the Jacobites retreated.

At Fort Augustus in March the artillery had some success; a French engineer mortared the fort's magazine, forcing its surrender. 
Grant was still absent at Culloden, however, where the Jacobite field artillery was commanded by John Finlayson. It was quickly overwhelmed, despite the efforts of a French regular, Capt. du Saussay, to bring up a further gun towards the close of the battle.

Equipment

 Traditional depictions of the Jacobite army often showed men dressed in Highland fashion and armed with broadswords and targes, weaponry essentially unchanged since the 17th century. Such imagery suited both Government propaganda and the heroic traditions of Gaelic verse but was fundamentally exaggerated. While tacksmen and urban volunteers from the professions might carry a backsword, or a broadsword if they were officers, in reality it appears that most men carried firelocks, and were drilled in accordance with up to date military practises.

At the start many of the Highland levies were poorly armed: one Edinburgh resident reported that the Jacobites carried a mixture of antiquated guns, agricultural tools like pitchforks and scythes and a few Lochaber axes and swords. Many officers and cavalrymen had pistols of local manufacture, the trade being centred in Doune. At the start of the Rising Charles managed to procure a shipment of broadswords made cheaply in Germany (famously carrying the inscription "Prosperity to Schotland and no Union") and 2,000 targes. However, following the victory at Prestonpans and subsequent shipments of French and Spanish pattern 17.5 mm muskets into Montrose and Stonehaven, the army had access to modern firelocks fitted with bayonets, which formed the main weaponry of the rank and file. The men appear to have regarded the targes as an encumbrance and threw most of them away prior to Culloden.

Despite this, Jacobite officers recognised the psychological value of the "Highland charge" against inexperienced troops, particularly as the broadsword inflicted wounds that were spectacular, if far less damaging than bullet wounds. Lord George noted their reputation was such that at Penrith, Glengarry's regiment merely had to "throw their plaids" for a group of local militia to "[make] off at the top gallop". Infantry tactics were strongly predicated on exploiting this effect to make the opposition break and run: eyewitness Andrew Henderson noted the Jacobites "making a dreadful huzza, and even crying 'Run, ye dogs'" as they closed with Barrell's regiment at Culloden.

The tactic was less successful when opposing troops held their ground, particularly as it was customary to fire a single shot at close range, then drop the firearm and charge home with the sword. Once their charge was held up at Culloden, the Highlanders were reduced to throwing stones at the government troops, unable to respond in any other way.

As an insurgent army, the Jacobites did not have a formal uniform and most men initially wore the clothes they joined in, whether the coat and breeches of the Lowlands or the short coat and plaid of the Highlands. Notable exceptions were Charles's Lifeguard, who were issued with blue coats faced with scarlet, as were the Royal Ecossais; the Irish Brigade, as the lineal descendant of James II's Royal Irish Army, wore their traditional red coats. The well-dressed cavalry were used in an attempt to impress the local populace in several places: an observer at Derby said that they were "likely young men" who "made a fine show", whereas the infantry "appeared more like a parcel of chimney sweeps".

As a basic sign of Stuart allegiance all men wore a white cockade and many wore, or were issued with, the characteristic knitted and felted blue bonnet, including the Royal Ecossais. There was frequent use of various forms of saltire as a badge, including on regimental standards. As the rebellion went on, however, there is evidence that the Jacobite leadership began to use clothing made up of tartan cloth as a simple form of uniform irrespective of the origin of the troops wearing it. Tartan cloth was readily available in quantity, served to distinctively identify the Jacobites, and was exploited by the rebels both as a symbol of Stuart loyalty and, increasingly, of Scottish identity. An intelligence report sent to the Duke of Atholl, however, reached the conclusion that the Jacobites were primarily "puting now many of the Lowlanders in highland dress, to make the number of Highlanders appear 
more".

Pay

Accounts maintained by Lawrence Oliphant of Gask, who was deputy commander under Strathallan at Perth, show that a fixed scale of pay was maintained until relatively late in the campaign. Private soldiers were paid 6d. per day, while sergeants received 9d.; officers' pay ranged from ensigns at 1s.6d. per day to colonels at 6s. There was however little consistency in how individual regiments were paid by their colonels and men were paid at intervals ranging from one to 21 days: although generally paid in advance some companies received theirs in arrears.

From February 1746 pay rates went into a decline, in addition to falling into arrears. The narratives of James Maxwell of Kirkconnell and of Murray suggest that by March money had run out completely, and that men were instead paid weekly in oatmeal.

Statistics

A detailed examination of available records concluded that the maximum operational force available to the Jacobites was about 9,000 men, with the total recruitment during the campaign possibly reaching as high as 13,140 exclusive of Franco-Irish reinforcements. The gap between two figures could be explained by desertion, although it also seems probable that many enlistment figures were based on over-optimistic reports by Jacobite agents.

The vast majority of battlefield casualties during the campaign - around 1,500 - occurred at Culloden. Although many Jacobites went into hiding or simply returned home after dismissal, a total of 3,471 men were recorded as prisoners after the rebellion, though this figure probably includes some double counting, French POWs, and civilians. From these there were around 40 summary executions of 'deserters' and 73 executions after trial; 936 were sentenced to or volunteered for transportation; and 7-800 were drafted into the ranks of the British Army, often for service in the colonies. The remainder, with the exception of a few senior officers still at large, were pardoned by a 1747 Act of Indemnity.

References

Sources
 
 
 
 
 
 
 
 
 
 
 
 
 
 

Jacobite rising of 1745
Military units and formations established in 1745
Military units and formations disestablished in 1746